Panic Room is a 2002 American thriller film directed by David Fincher.

Panic Room may also refer to:

Panic room or safe room, a fortified room in a residence or business
Panic Room (band), a Welsh progressive rock band
Panic Room (album) or the title song, by Paulmac, 2005
"Panic Room" (song), a 2018 song by Au/Ra and CamelPhat
"Panic Room", a song by Silent Planet from Everything Was Sound, 2016

See also
"02 Panic Room", a 2007 song by Riverside
"Panic Roommate", a 2011 episode of the TV series Gossip Girl